Guwahati–Secunderabad Express is a Superfast Express train belonging to Northeast Frontier Railway zone that runs between Guwahati and Secunderabad in India. The train is currently being operated with 12513/12514 numbers on a weekly basis.

Overview

It is another fast alternative next after Falaknuma Express on this route. The train has less halts than any other train from Kolkata/Bhubaneswar to Secunderabad as it has just three halts between Vishakhapatnam and Secunderabad. Though it's a superfast train, it is less clean comparing to other trains. But the good fact is that, the train arrives at every halt almost in time.

The 12514/Guwahati–Secunderabad Express has an average speed of 55 km/h and covers 2553 km in 45h 40m. The 12513 Secunderabad–Guwahati Express has an average speed of 54 km/h and covers the same distance in 46h 30m.

This train is now diverted via Guntur.

Route
ASSAM (04 Stops)
 Guwahati Railway Station (Starts)  
 
 
 

WEST BENGAL (09 Stops)
 
 
 New Jalpaiguri (Siliguri)
 
 
 
 
 Howrah (Kolkata)
 

BIHAR (02 Stops)
 
 

ODISHA (08 Stops)
 
 
 
 
 
 
 Balugaon
 

ANDHRA PRADESH (07 Stops)
 Palasa
 Srikakulam
 
 
 
  

TELANGANA (1Stop)
 (Ends)

Timings

The train departs from Platform #6 of Guwahati at 6:20 IST, every Thursdays and arrives at Platform #3 of Secunderabad Junction at 4:00 IST, every Saturdays. From Platform #6 of Secunderabad Junction, the train departs at 7:30 IST, every Sundays and arrives at Platform #5 of Guwahati at 6:00 IST, every Tuesdays.

Classes

The train usually consists of a massive load of 24 standard ICF coach:

 1 AC Two Tier
 1 AC Two Tier Cum Three Tier
 4 AC Three Tiers 
 12 Sleeper classes
 3 General (unreserved)
 1 Pantry car
 2 Seating (Ladies/Disabled) Cum Luggage Rakes.

As is customary with most other train services in India, coach composition may be amended at the discretion of Indian Railways, depending on demand.

Coach composition

Traction

1. As the route of Northeast Frontier Railway is under electrification, a New Guwahati-based ALCO-251C WDM-3A diesel locomotive hauls the train from Guwahati to Howrah. In vice versa, it gets a Howrah Diesel Loco Shed-based ALCO-251C WDM-3A/ALCO DL560C WDM-3D diesel locomotive.

2. After that, it reverses at Howrah and gets a Santragachi Electric Loco Shed-based Indian locomotive class WAP-4 electric locomotive for the way from Howrah to Vishakhapatnam. In vice versa, it is hauled by a Howrah Electric Loco Shed-based Indian locomotive class WAP-4 electric locomotive.

3. It again reverses at Vishakhapatnam and gets a Vijayawada-based Indian locomotive class WAP-4 electric locomotive for the way up Vijayawada.

4. It used to reverse at Vijayawada before with Lallaguda-based Indian locomotive class WAP-4 electric locomotive for the rest way up to Secunderabad.But now it is diverted via Guntur

References

External links 

12513/Secunderabad - Guwahati  Superfast Express India Rail Info
12514/Guwahati - Secunderabad Superfast Express India Rail Info

Transport in Secunderabad
Transport in Guwahati
Rail transport in Assam
Rail transport in Telangana
Rail transport in Andhra Pradesh
Express trains in India
Rail transport in Odisha
Rail transport in West Bengal
Railway services introduced in 2004